Bertrand Nompar de Caumont, marquis de La Force (1 August 1724 – 22 January 1773) was a French nobleman, the son of Jean François de Caumont (1694 – 1755) and Jeanne de Maury (died 1770). He was a knight, and held the titles of seigneur de Beauvilla then marquis de La Force, Caumont and Taillebourg, comte de Mussidan and baron de Castelnau-Les-Milandes. In the royal household he was appointed as Garde du Corps du Roi and Gentilhomme de la Chambre.

Marriage and issue
He married 5 June 1757 Adélaïde Luce de Galard de Brassac, (1739 – 1829), granddaughter of Armand-Nompar II de Caumont, duc de la Force. The couple had  four sons and eight daughters: 
 Anne Jacobe, (19 August 1758 – ), married François Marie Armand, marquis Piovera 
 Jacques Armand, marquis de La Force, (1759–1762) 
 Catherine, (c. 1760 – ), married Gilbert de Gironde Comte de Pille 
 Alexandre Nompar,(1764 – 1765) 
 Renée Philiberte, (c. 1765 – ) 
 Anne Philiberte, (1766 – 1777)
 Louis Joseph Nompar, married 11 May 1784, Sophie Pauline d'Ossun (1772 – ) 
 François Pierre Bertrand, (29 November 1772 – 28 March 1854), comte then marquis de Caumont La force
 Josephine Louise, married in 1779, comte de Béthune 
 Marie, married 8 March 1781, Anne Louis François, Marquis de Lordat, comte de Bram 
 Catherine, married 1 August 1784, Hippolyte César de Moretoul 
 Louise Josephine, (1769 – ), married Marc Antoine Alexandre Dieudonné Edmond, comte de Mesnard

He died 22 January 1773 in Versailles. His widow, Adelaide de Galard, died in October 1829

Footnotes

Sources

External links
 Bertrand Nompar de Caumont Family tree
 Seigneurs de Caumont-La Force Lineage of the lords of Caumont and Dukes of La Force

1724 births
1773 deaths
Marquesses of La Force
French marquesses
Barons of France